The Münchner Stadtanzeiger was a weekly newspaper published in Munich from at least 1936 to 1997. From 1950 to 1997 it was published by the Süddeutsche Verlag. It referred to itself as a Heimatzeitung für die Stadt und den Landkreis München (homeland newspaper for the city of Munich and for the district of Munich).

The Münchner Stadtanzeiger was founded by the German journalist Josef Ackermann (1896–1959) who was imprisoned in Nazi concentration camps for several times, who became director of the municipal intelligence service after World War II, and later member of the Senate of Bavaria. From 1959 to 1989 Erich Hartstein (b. 1925) was head of the editorial department. At this time, the newspaper was published twice a week as supplement of the Süddeutsche Zeitung. In 1997 the content of the newspaper merged into the local news section of the Süddeutsche Zeitung.

References

1945 establishments in Germany
1997 disestablishments in Germany
Defunct newspapers published in Germany
Defunct weekly newspapers
German-language newspapers
Newspapers published in Munich
Newspapers established in 1945
Publications disestablished in 1997
Weekly newspapers published in Germany